Kiridashi may refer to:
Kiridashi (knife), a Japanese knife
Kiridashi (horse), a Canadian Thoroughbred racehorse